Caprellidae is a family of amphipods commonly known as skeleton shrimps. Their common name denotes the threadlike slender body which allows them to virtually disappear among the fine filaments of seaweed, hydroids and bryozoans. They are sometimes also known as ghost shrimps.

Description

Caprellids are easily recognizable from other amphipods because of their slender elongated bodies. Their bodies can be divided into three parts: the cephalon (head), the pereon (thorax), and the abdomen. The pereon comprises most of the length of the body. It is divided into seven segments known as pereonites. The cephalon is usually fused to the first pereonite; while the highly reduced and almost invisible abdomen is attached to the posterior of the seventh pereonite. They possess two pairs of antennae, with the first pair usually longer than the second pair. The cephalon contains mandibles, maxillae, and maxillipeds which function as mouthparts.

Each pereonite has a pair of appendages known as pereopods. The first two pairs are modified into raptorial appendages known as gnathopods. These are used for feeding and defense, as well as locomotion. The third and fourth pair of pereopods are usually reduced or absent altogether. In the third and fourth pereonites are two pairs of gills. Sometimes a third pair of gills may also be present on the second pereonite. In mature females, brood pouches formed by extensions of the coxae (oostegites) are present on the third and fourth pereonites. The fifth to seventh pair of pereopods are smaller than the gnathopods and are used for clasping objects the animals anchor themselves upon.

Most caprellids are highly sexually dimorphic, with the males usually being far larger than the females.

Ecology

Caprellids are exclusively marine and are found in oceans worldwide. A few species are found in the ocean depths, but most prefer low intertidal zones and subtidal waters among eelgrass, hydroids and bryozoans. They are typically seen attached to substrate by their grasping appendages called the pereopods.

Caprellids are omnivorous, feeding on diatoms, detritus, protozoans, smaller amphipods, and crustacean larvae. Some species are filter feeders, using their antennae to filter food from the water or scrape it off the substrate. Most species are predators that sit and wait like a praying mantis, with their gnathopods ready to snatch any smaller invertebrates which come along. They accentuate their adaptive form and colouration by assuming an angular pose, resembling that of the fronds among which they live. They remain motionless for long periods of time while waiting to ambush their prey, often protozoa or small worms.

Caprellids are typically preyed upon by surf perch, shrimp, nudibranchs such as the lion nudibranch Melibe leonina and brooding anemones (Epiactis prolifera). Since they often inhabit eelgrass beds with sessile jellyfish, (Haliclystus and Thaumatoscyphus), the caprellids frequently become jellyfish food. Caprellids are not normally considered a main source of food for fish, but when shiner perch (Cymatogaster aggregata) migrate into the eelgrass beds for reproduction, they target caprellids.

Reproduction and growth
Mating can only occur when the female is between the new and hardened exoskeletons, which both male and female molt in order to grow. After mating the female will brood the fertilized eggs within her brood pouch. The young will hatch and emerged as juvenile adults. After mating, the female in some species have been known to kill the males by injecting venom from a claw within their gnathopod.

Taxonomy
Caprellidae is classified under the superfamily Caprelloidea which belongs to the infraorder Caprellida of the suborder Corophiidea. Caprellidae contains 1345 genera in three subfamilies.

Caprellinae

Abyssicaprella McCain, 1966
Aciconula Mayer, 1903
Aeginella Boeck, 1861
Aeginellopsis Arimoto, 1970
Aeginina Norman, 1905
Caprella Lamarck, 1801
Caprellaporema Guerra-García, 2003
Cubadeutella Ortiz et al., 2009
Deutella Mayer, 1890
Eupariambus K. H. Barnard, 1957
Hemiaegina Mayer, 1890
Heterocaprella Arimoto, 1976
Liriopes Arimoto, 1978
Liropropus Laubitz, 1995
Liropus Mayer, 1890
Mayerella Huntsman, 1915
Metacaprella Mayer, 1903
Metaprotella Mayer, 1890
Monoliropus Mayer, 1903
Noculacia Mayer, 1903
Orthoprotella Mayer, 1903
Paracaprella Mayer, 1890
Paradeutella Mayer, 1890
Paradicaprella Hirayama, 1990
Paraprotella Mayer, 1903
Pariambus Stebbing, 1888
Parvipalpina Stephensen, 1944
Parvipalpus Mayer, 1890
Pedoculina Carausu, 1941
Pedonculocaprella Kaim-Malka, 1983
Pedotrina Arimoto, 1978
Postoparacaprella Arimoto, 1981
Premohemiaegina Arimoto, 1978
Pretritella Arimoto, 1980
Proaeginina Stephensen, 1940
Proliropus Mayer, 1903
Propodalirius Mayer, 1903
Protella Dana, 1853
Protellina Stephensen, 1944
Protellopsis Stebbing, 1888
Protoaeginella Laubitz & Mills, 1972
Prototritella Arimoto, 1977
Pseudaeginella Mayer, 1890
Pseudolirius Mayer, 1890
Pseudoliropus Laubitz, 1970
Pseudoprotella Mayer, 1890
Tanzacaprella Guerra-García, 2001
Thorina Stephensen, 1944
Triantella Mayer, 1903
Triliropus Mayer, 1903
Triperopus Mayer, 1903
Triprotella Arimoto, 1970
Tritella Mayer, 1890
Tropicaprella Guerra-García & Takeuchi, 2003
Verrucaprella Laubitz, 1995

Paracercopinae

Cercops Krøyer, 1843
Paracercops Vassilenko, 1972
Pseudocercops Vassilenko, 1972

Phtisicinae

Aeginoides Schellenberg, 1926
Caprellina Thomson, 1879
Caprellinoides Stebbing, 1888
Chaka Griffiths, 1974
Dodecas Stebbing, 1883
Dodecasella K. H. Barnard, 1931
Hemiproto McCain, 1968
Hircella Mayer, 1882
Jigurru Guerra-García, 2006
Liriarchus Mayer, 1912
Mayericaprella Guerra-García, 2006
Metaproto Mayer, 1903
Paedaridium Mayer, 1903
Paraproto Mayer, 1903
Perotripus Dougherty & Steinberg, 1953
Phtisica Slabber, 1769
Prellicana Mayer, 1903
Protogeton Mayer, 1903
Protomima Mayer, 1903
Protoplesius Mayer, 1903
Pseudocaprellina Sundara Raj, 1927
Pseudododecas McCain & Gray, 1971
Pseudoprellicana Guerra-García, 2006
Pseudoproto Mayer, 1903
Pseudoprotomima McCain, 1969
Quadrisegmentum Hirayama, 1988
Semidodecas Laubitz, 1995
Symmetrella Laubitz, 1995

References

External links

Some information on Caprella bathytatos
Photos of skeleton shrimp

Corophiidea
Crustacean families